Saint Mary's Wilderness is a U.S. Wilderness Area in the George Washington and Jefferson National Forests. Saint Mary's Wilderness is the largest Virginia Wilderness on national forest land.

Saint Mary's Wilderness includes the drainages of Cellar Hollow, Spy Run, and the upper part of the Saint Mary's River. Each waterway is a tributary of the South River; via the Maury and James rivers, which are part of the Chesapeake Bay watershed.

History 
The Saint Mary's River gorge was mined for manganese ore and iron ore from the early 1900s until the mines were abandoned in the 1950s. Scattered remains of the mining operations are still evident. Saint Mary's was designated a Wilderness as a part of the Virginia Wilderness Act of 1984.

Recreation
Saint Mary's Wilderness is particularly popular during summer due to a large number of waterfalls within its boundaries. Fishermen can take native trout from the Saint Mary's River.

There is an extensive network of hiking trails, including: 
Saint Mary's River Trail 
Saint Mary's Gorge Trail
Mine Bank Creek Trail
Cellar Mountain Trail

See also
List of U.S. Wilderness Areas
Wilderness Act

References

External links
 National Forest Web site 
 Hiking Upward website account of Saint Mary's hike 
 Wilderness.net 
 TopoQuest topographic map 
 Saint Mary's Hike detail 
 Details of a joint Forest Service/James Madison University project to lime streams in Saint Mary's Wilderness

Protected areas of Augusta County, Virginia
George Washington and Jefferson National Forests
IUCN Category Ib
Wilderness areas of Virginia
Protected areas established in 1984
1984 establishments in Virginia